"Big Days" is the first episode of the sixth season of the CBS sitcom How I Met Your Mother, and the 113th episode overall. It originally aired on September 20, 2010.

Plot 

Future Ted pontificates on the important days in a relationship: "the day you meet the girl of your dreams, and the day you marry her." The audience is shown a church backyard, where Marshall brings Ted a beer, both men dressed in tuxedos. Marshall notices Ted is nervous by his habit of ripping the beer bottle labels. Flashing back to the present day at MacLaren's, Barney notices Ted doing the same thing as he sits grading papers. Amidst his work, Ted is nervous about a blonde girl at the bar he wants to approach, and Barney boosts his confidence before calling "dibs".

While they argue, Robin walks into the bar, looking disheveled and holding a burger and a bag of fries. After being left by Don weeks earlier, she has sunk into a depression, neglecting to wash and completely letting herself go, even going as far as to swear Ted to not sleep with her; which he finds easier in her current state. She concurs with Ted that the girl is on a date, as she is reading a book. When Barney heckles her appearance, Robin decides to prove him wrong, so she returns to the apartment to clean up and returns to the bar in a sun dress, much to Barney's delight, before waving off a guy who hits on her.

Meanwhile, Lily has planned a romantic evening at home, with candles and banjo music, but gets angry with Marshall when she finds out that he has told his father that they are trying to have a child. Marshall argues that his father is a part of his life and deserves to know, but Lily cannot stand Mr. Eriksen's constant calls and domineering personality. The two eventually reconcile, agreeing that Marshall's father is somewhat insane and very enthusiastic, just like Marshall.

Ted notices the girl (Kaylee DeFer) that he has been watching at the bar is standing next to Cindy (Rachel Bilson), the girl he had briefly dated from his school, and whose roommate Future Ted says is the eponymous mother. After their one date, Cindy had treated him badly when they met during the school day. Ted assumes that the woman at the bar is Cindy's roommate, and is determined to meet her. Cindy sees Ted and takes him aside, thanking him for helping her realize what she was looking for, and invites him to say goodbye to her before he leaves.

Ted approaches the two ladies, assuming he is going to be introduced to the woman he thinks is Cindy's roommate, but at that moment, Cindy kisses her, and Ted realizes that the blond woman is not Cindy's roommate but a girl she was dating. Future Ted tells his kids that Cindy and the nameless blond woman ended up having a daughter together. Then, he tells his children that he met their mother at a wedding. The scene flashes forward to a wedding: the church backyard seen earlier in the episode with Ted and Marshall. Ted admits to Marshall that he is nervous about his toast at the wedding and he wants it to be perfect. It is also revealed that Ted is the best man, and is called in by Lily. It starts to rain, and Ted says that he does not have an umbrella.

Production

Critical response 

Donna Bowman of The A.V. Club gave the episode a B+ score. She said that the episode put in the show's "core competencies in a shrewdly calculated package," citing flash-forwards to the day Ted meets the Mother and how other elements could have a role in making it happen.

Robert Canning  of IGN gave the episode a rating of 8.5 out of 10.

DeAnn Welker of Television Without Pity gave the episode a B+.

Chris O'Hara of TV Fanatic gave the episode 3.5 out of 5 stars.

References

External links 
 

How I Met Your Mother (season 6) episodes
2010 American television episodes
American LGBT-related television episodes